Liunan District is one of four districts of Liuzhou, Guangxi Zhuang Autonomous Region, China.

References

External links 

County-level divisions of Guangxi
Liuzhou